Forecast: Sonny & Red is an album by American jazz saxophonists Sonny Stitt and Red Holloway featuring performances recorded in 1976 for the Catalyst label.

Reception

Scott Yanow of Allmusic stated, "Sonny Stitt and Red Holloway make a perfect team on this exciting jam session record... Holloway was able to keep up with the combative Stitt and the fireworks are well worth savoring".

Track listing
 "The Way You Look Tonight" (Jerome Kern, Dorothy Fields) - 5:20  
 "Forecast: Sonny & Red" (Art Hillery) - 4:50  
 "You Don't Know What Love Is/I'm Getting Sentimental Over You" (Gene de Paul, Don Ray/George Bassman, Ned Washington) - 10:45
 "Lester Leaps In" (Lester Young) - 6:42  
 "Just Friends" (John Klenner, Sam M. Lewis) - 6:20  
 "All God's Chillun Got Rhythm" (Bronisław Kaper, Walter Jurmann, Gus Kahn) - 4:00

Personnel
Sonny Stitt - tenor saxophone
Red Holloway - tenor saxophone, alto saxophone
Art Hillery - piano
Larry Gales - bass 
Clarence Johnston - drums

References 

1976 albums
Catalyst Records (jazz) albums
Sonny Stitt albums
Red Holloway albums